Manassas station is a train station in Manassas, Virginia. It was originally built by the Southern Railway in 1914.

History

The first Manassas station was a small log building where the Orange and Alexandria Railroad and the Manassas Gap Railroad intersected. In 1904, the building was replaced with a brick passenger station. This station caught fire on June 25, 1914 and was destroyed.

The present station was constructed in October 1914. The city bought the depot from Norfolk Southern Railway in the 1990s and renovated it under the direction of The Manassas Museum System. Workers restored the original 1914 paint colors, repointed brick, laid new plaster, overhauled mechanical systems and installed reproductions of original doors and light fixtures. A tile roof similar to the original was also installed. The $575,000 project was completed in 1997. Today the depot has a waiting room and also houses a tourist information center and the James & Marion Payne Memorial Railroad Exhibition Gallery.

The station appears on the cover of Manassas's 1972 self-titled double album. The image depicts musicians Chris Hillman and Stephen Stills standing on the north end of the then-Southern Railway depot. The station can also be seen in the music video for the Steve Winwood song Back in the High Life Again.

References

External links
 

VRE – Manassas

Buildings and structures in Manassas, Virginia
Amtrak stations in Virginia
Transportation in Virginia
Virginia Railway Express stations
Stations along Southern Railway lines in the United States
Railway stations in the United States opened in 1914
1914 establishments in Virginia
Former Chesapeake and Ohio Railway stations